Muhammad Ramzul Zahini bin Adenan (born 11 December 1987) is a Malaysian footballer who plays as a striker.

Club career

Kelantan FA
Born in Tumpat, Kelantan, Ramzul started his career on year 2006 with Kelantan President's Cup Team for two years. Then, he was promoted to the senior squad after shows an excellent performances with the youth team.

On the 2012 Malaysia Super League season, he failed to get the first team squad after the foreign players were eligible to play in the Malaysia Super League.

Selangor FA
Then, he decided to sign with Selangor FA for the 2013 Malaysia Super League season.

T-Team F.C.
In 2014, Ramzul moved to T-Team F.C.

International career
He had been called up by K.Rajagobal for Malaysia national under-23 football team on year 2010 but he was suffer an injury on that time.

Career statistics

Club statistics

References

Penternak Arnab berjaya

External links

1987 births
Living people
Malaysian footballers
Kelantan FA players
Selangor FA players
People from Kelantan
Association football forwards